Samuel Bedlow (born  in Bury, England) is a rugby union player who most recently played for the Bristol Bears. His regular position is centre.

Career

Early Life

At youth level, Bedlow represented Sale Sharks at Under-18, Under-19 and A level and also played for National League 3 North side Rossendale.

Sale Sharks

Bedlow signed a professional contract with Sale Sharks prior to the 2013–2014 season, where he mostly played for their academy side, the Sale Jets.

He didn't make any appearances for them during the 2013–2014 season, but he did join National League 2 North side Preston Grasshoppers where he made four appearances.

During the 2014–15 season, Bedlow joined National League 1 side Fylde on a dual registration basis and made nine appearances for the side, scoring a try on his debut for Fylde in a 29–29 draw against Darlington Mowden Park. He made his first class debut for Sale Sharks on 1 February 2015 in their 2014–15 LV Cup match against Newcastle Falcons, starting in a 19–39 defeat.

Bristol Bears
On 2 May 2017, it was confirmed that Bedlow signs for Premiership rivals Bristol Bears ahead of the 2017-18 season. He has made 58 first-team appearances during his five seasons with the club.

Return to Sale Sharks
On 27 February 2023, it was confirmed that Bedloe would return to his old club Sale Sharks on a long-term deal ahead of the 2023-24 season.

References

1995 births
Living people
English rugby union players
Fylde Rugby Club players
Rugby union centres
Rugby union players from Bury, Greater Manchester
Sale Sharks players